Leyli and Majnun is an opera in four acts by Uzeyir Hajibeyov, to an Azerbaijani libretto written by the composer and his brother Jeyhun Hajibeyov. The opera was first performed in Baku in 1908.

Performance history
The opera is considered the First Opera of the Muslim East.

The first performance of the opera was led by Huseyn Arablinski and Hajibeyov himself played violin.

Uzeyir Hajibeyov and his brother Jeyhun Hajibeyov wrote the libretto for the opera based on Azerbaijani poet Muhammad Fuzuli's poem Layla and Majnun; most parts of the poem remained unchanged.

Thus, the opera Leyli and Majnun became a founder of the unique new genre in musical culture of the world, which synthesizes oriental and European musical forms, resembling a dialogue of two musical cultures of East and West.

This opera has been shown more than 2,000 times at the Azerbaijan State Academic Opera and Ballet Theater as well as in other countries such as Russia, Ukraine, Iran, Turkey, Georgia, Uzbekistan and Turkmenistan.

Roles

Synopsis

Act 1
Scene 1
Boys and girls go out of school. Beautiful Leyli and Geys love each other; they are chatting fondly, forgetting about others. But friends find Leyli's behavior very unethical and hastily take her away.
Geys begs father to marry Leyli to him, without whom he can't live.

Scene 2
Leyli's parents have heard about Gey's love to Leyli and Leyli's mutual love to him. Girl's mother angrily reproaches her and Leyli listens to her sadly. She doesn't deny that she loves Geys more than anything in the world.

Geys's father comes to bring in Leyli and Geys together. Leyli's father sharply and decidedly refuses it: he will never decide to marry his daughter to Majnun (madman) – how everybody calls Geys, who becomes crazy by love.

Knowing about refusal, Geys frantically curses people and his sad destiny. He seeks for loneliness and takes himself off to desert.

But Leyli's destiny is solved in other way. Her parents have agreed to marry her to wealthy Ibn Salam. Astonished by these news Leyli fainted away.

Act 2
Sorrow changed Geys's mind. He walks in mountains and sands of desert, thinking about Leyli. Majnun's father and friend – Zeyd have found him – but crazy young man hasn't decided them. Emaciated appearance of the anchoret, his uncheerful destiny and his father's sorrow arouses sympathy of Arabs passing through the desert. A commander Nofel shows interest in them. He would like to help unlucky Majnun and sends a herald to Leyli's father.

But even Nofel's intervention has made Leyli's father to change his mind. Then Nofel decides to compel him by force and challenges him to a struggle. Leyli's father asks him for execution and explains the reason of refusal: his daughter Leyli is other person's fiancée.

Act 3
The wedding day of Ibn Salam and Leyli comes. Guests are happily feasting, wishing happiness to the newlywed. And at last the newlyweds remain together. Leyli is confused. At this moment Majnun's weak voice is heard, which appears near them as a shadow. Ibn Salam stands still, Leyli faints away. Servants carefully take the madman away.

Act 4
Scene 1
There is not happiness in Ibn Salam's house. Leyli is ill by depression. She confesses to husband that she loves geys and can't love anybody anymore. Let Ibn Salam waits, maybe her feelings to Majnun will pass. Pained Ibn Salam goes away. And suddenly Majnun again appears in front of Leyli as a bodiless shadow. He bitterly complaints to Leyli, that she has betrayed him, destroyed his life, brought sorrow and pain. Forgetting about her illness, Leyli throws herself into her lover's arms, but he doesn't recognize her, he looks for and calls his former, pure lover.

Leyli's heart can't bear it:

She dies in arms of Ibn Salam.

Scene 2
Mejnun comes to Leyli's grave. Now, Leyli has decided to belong him, now they will be together forever. Desperated, Majnun falls on the lover's grave and dies.

References

External links
 

Operas
Operas by Uzeyir Hajibeyov
Azerbaijani-language operas
1908 operas
Operas based on literature